Prince Hubertus zu Loewenstein-Wertheim-Freudenberg (October 14, 1906 – November 28, 1984) was a German historian and political figure who was an early opponent of Adolf Hitler. He fled Germany and helped to promote anti-Nazism in the United States. He was a former member of Parliament, and was the author of over 40 books. He was the head of the Free German Authors Association, and was decorated by Pope John XXIII for work toward reconciliation between the Roman Catholic and the Greek Orthodox church.

He was the son of Count Maximilian of Löwenstein-Scharfeneck and Constance, daughter of Henry de Worms, 1st Baron Pirbright. Prince Hubertus was instrumental in returning the island of Heligoland to West Germany from Britain which used this high-sea island for bombing training after Britain occupied it after World War II.

See also
Löwenstein

References

External links
 

1906 births
1984 deaths
People from Kufstein District
German Roman Catholics
Centre Party (Germany) politicians
Free Democratic Party (Germany) politicians
German Party (1947) politicians
Christian Democratic Union of Germany politicians
House of Löwenstein-Wertheim-Freudenberg
Princes of Löwenstein-Wertheim-Freudenberg
Knights Commander of the Order of Merit of the Federal Republic of Germany
Recipients of the Saarland Order of Merit
20th-century German historians
German male non-fiction writers
German anti-fascists